Colonel Henry Arthur Herbert PC (1815 – 26 February 1866), was an Anglo-Irish politician in the Parliament of the United Kingdom.

Political career
Herbert was a Member of Parliament (MP) for Kerry from 1847 until his death, and served as Chief Secretary for Ireland from 1857 to 1858. He was appointed Lord Lieutenant and Custos Rotulorum of Kerry in 1853.

In Dublin, Herbert was a member of the Kildare Street Club.

Family
Herbert was the grandson of Henry Arthur Herbert (1756–1821), MP for Kerry from 1806 to 1813 and the son of Charles John Herbert (1785-1823) and Louisa Anne (née Middleton) (1796-1828), who was the daughter of Nathaniel Middleton.  Henry's grandmother, Anne, was the daughter of a 'Jamaican of colour' called Elizabeth Augier.

He was educated at Eton and graduated from Trinity College, Cambridge in 1835.

In September 1837, Herbert married the artist Mary Balfour, whom he had met in Rome. They had four children: Eleanor (1839-1907), Henry Arthur (1840–1901), Charles (1842-1891) and Blanche (1846-1920).

Herbert's family owned the Muckross Estate near Killarney in County Kerry, and they moved there to Torc Cottage after their wedding. Mary brought a large dowry to the marriage, and in 1839 they began construction of the large Muckross House. It was finished in 1843, shortly before the Great Famine. Herbert is buried in Killegy graveyard, near Muckross village.

References

Muckross House: The Herberts

External links

1815 births
1866 deaths
Alumni of Trinity College, Cambridge
19th-century Anglo-Irish people
Lord-Lieutenants of Kerry
Members of the Privy Council of the United Kingdom
Members of the Privy Council of Ireland
Members of the Parliament of the United Kingdom for County Kerry constituencies (1801–1922)
UK MPs 1847–1852
UK MPs 1852–1857
UK MPs 1857–1859
UK MPs 1859–1865
UK MPs 1865–1868
Chief Secretaries for Ireland
People educated at Eton College
Black British MPs
Black British politicians